Blonnie R. Watson (born February 3, 1937) is an American Democratic Party politician who represented the 29th Legislative District in the New Jersey General Assembly from 2016 to 2018.

A resident of the Central Ward of Newark, Watson retired from the United States Postal Service, where she worked as a Systems Compliance Executive. She served on the Zoning Board of Adjustment in Newark and was elected to serve on the Essex County Board of Chosen Freeholders from 1997 to 2014. Elected to serve six three-year terms as an at-large freeholder, Watson served five years as the board's vice president and eight as president.

Watson was sworn into office on July 21, 2016, by Assembly Speaker Vincent Prieto, after being selected to fill the seat of L. Grace Spencer, who had resigned from office on June 30, 2016, to become a judge of the New Jersey Superior Court.

References

External links
Assemblywoman Watson's legislative web page, New Jersey Legislature
New Jersey Legislature financial disclosure forms
2015

1937 births
Living people
African-American state legislators in New Jersey
African-American women in politics
Democratic Party members of the New Jersey General Assembly
County commissioners in New Jersey
Politicians from Newark, New Jersey
Women state legislators in New Jersey
21st-century American politicians
21st-century American women politicians
21st-century African-American women
21st-century African-American politicians
20th-century African-American people
20th-century African-American women